Toe shoe may refer to:

 Pointe shoe, used by ballet dancers when dancing on the tips of toes
 Vibram FiveFingers, a type of shoe with individual toe pockets
 Minimalist shoe, a shoe designed to mimic barefoot conditions, some of which feature individual toe pockets 
 Peep-toe shoe, a shoe with an opening near the toe
 Steel-toe boot, a shoe with protective steel shell